"Come Some Rainy Day" is a song written by Billy Kirsch and Bat McGrath, and recorded by American country music artist Wynonna.  It was released in December 1997 as the second single from her album The Other Side. The song reached number 14 on the Billboard Hot Country Singles & Tracks chart in March 1998.

Chart performance

Year-end charts

References

1998 singles
1997 songs
Wynonna Judd songs
Universal Records singles
Curb Records singles
Songs written by Billy Kirsch
Song recordings produced by Brent Maher